Spanaiika (also Σπανεϊκα - Spaneika) is a village in Arcadia, Greece. It is part of the community of Petrina. In 2011 it had a population of 21. It is situated in the northern foothills of the Taygetus mountains, 1.5 km southwest of Petrina, 3 km southeast of Falaisia and 15 km southeast of Megalopoli.

Population

References

External links
History and information about Spanaiika
Spaneika at GTP Travel Pages

See also
List of settlements in Arcadia

Falaisia
Populated places in Arcadia, Peloponnese